William Lyall Wilson (1866–1914) was a minister of the Church of Scotland who worked in the Scots Mission Church in Argentina.

Life

He was born in Dundee on 6 May 1866 the son of Thomas Wilson (1835-1909) and his wife, Amelia Swan. He was educated at George Watson's College in Edinburgh then studied at Edinburgh University graduating MA.

He was licensed to preach by the Presbytery of Edinburgh in 1892 but initially failed to find a post so later in 1892 he replaced D. J. Moir Porteous of Port Glasgow as assistant in the Scots Church (St Andrews) in Buenos Aires in Argentina. He left this post in 1894 and returned to Britain.

In June 1895 he was ordained at Lesmahagow Parish Church. In June 1905 he translated to St Mary's Church in Dundee (one of the most prestigious charges in northern Scotland). In 1911 he translated to St Cuthbert's Church, Edinburgh in place of Rev Andrew Wallace Williamson, another prestigious charge.

He grew very ill and went to the Isle of Wight to recover. He died there in Ventnor on 2 August 1914 but his body was returned to Edinburgh for burial in Grange Cemetery for burial with his father who had died in 1909. His position at St Cuthbert's was filled by Rev Norman Maclean.

Family

In 1901 he married Margarita MacCulloch (1877-1945) daughter of James MacCulloch of Estanciero in Uruguay. They had a son, Thomas Leslie Lyall Wilson (1907-1945) and a daughter Agnes Ruby Wilson (b.1902). Thomas was killed in the Second World War serving as a Major in the Gordon Highlanders.

References
 

1866 births
1914 deaths
People from Dundee
People educated at George Watson's College
Alumni of the University of Edinburgh
19th-century Ministers of the Church of Scotland
20th-century Ministers of the Church of Scotland